The Ghana Registered Nurses' and Midwives' Association (GRNMA), formerly known as Ghana Registered Nurses’ Association (GRNA), is a professional body of registered nurses and midwives in Ghana. The association was formed in March 1960 in a merger between Qualified Nurses Association, led by Mr. Mettle-Nunoo, and the State Registered Nurses Association, led by Dr. Docial Kisseih.

References

Medical and health organisations based in Ghana